Max Friberg (born November 20, 1992) is a Swedish professional ice hockey winger who is currently playing under contract to Frölunda HC of the Swedish Hockey League (SHL). Friberg was drafted by the Anaheim Ducks in the fifth round, 143rd overall, of the 2011 NHL Entry Draft.

Playing career
Friberg played as a junior and in the lower divisions in his native Sweden with Skövde IK. To continue his development, Friberg moved to Timrå IK of the then Elitserien. His first Elitserien goal came on November 19, 2011, against Fredrik Norrena of Linköpings HC.

On June 15, 2012, Friberg agreed to a three-year, entry-level contract with the Anaheim Ducks.

Having agreed to a two-year extension before the 2015–16 season, on January 7, 2016, Friberg was surprisingly traded by the Ducks to the Montreal Canadiens in exchange for Dustin Tokarski. Friberg was assigned directly to conclude the remainder of the season with AHL affiliate, the St. John's IceCaps.

In the 2016–17 season, Friberg was assigned to continue with the IceCaps for the entirety of the campaign. As the IceCaps captain in their announced last season in the AHL, Friberg contributed 11 goals and 31 points in 71 games.

As an impending restricted free agent from the Canadiens, having never made his debut with the club, Friberg opted to return home to Sweden in agreeing to a three-year contract with Frölunda HC of the SHL on May 4, 2017. He later signed a three-year extension with Frölunda on June 25, 2019.

Career statistics

Regular season and playoffs

International

Awards and honours

References

External links

1992 births
Living people
Anaheim Ducks draft picks
Anaheim Ducks players
Frölunda HC players
IF Sundsvall Hockey players
Norfolk Admirals players
People from Skövde Municipality
St. John's IceCaps players
San Diego Gulls (AHL) players
Swedish ice hockey left wingers
Timrå IK players
Ice hockey players at the 2022 Winter Olympics
Olympic ice hockey players of Sweden
Sportspeople from Västra Götaland County